The 2022 Benelux World RX of Spa-Francorchamps was the sixth and seventh round of the ninth season of the FIA World Rallycross Championship. The event was double-header (two races in a weekend) held at the Circuit de Spa-Francorchamps in Francorchamps, Belgium.

World RX1e Championship Race 1 

Source

Heats

Progression 

 Race 1

 Race 2

Semi-finals 

 Semi-Final 1

 Note: Klara Andersson was disqualified from the semi-final after being deemed at fault for a first corner collision with Timmy Hansen, Bergström and René Münnich.

 Semi-Final 2

 Note: Johan Kristoffersson progressed to the Final race as one of two placed trird Semi-Finals drivers with better result in Progression Round.

Final

World RX1e Championship Race 2 

Source

Heats

Progression 

 Race 1

 Race 2

Semi-finals 

 Semi-Final 1

 Note: Klara Andersson was disqualified from the semi-final after being deemed at fault for a first corner collision with Timmy Hansen, Bergström and René Münnich.

 Semi-Final 2

 Note: Ole Christian Veiby progressed to the Final race as one of two placed trird Semi-Finals drivers with better result in Progression Round.

Final

Standings after the event 

Source

 Note: Only the top five positions are included.

References 

|- style="text-align:center"
|width="35%"|Previous race:2022 World RX of Portugal
|width="40%"|FIA World Rallycross Championship2022 season
|width="35%"|Next race:2022 World RX of Catalunya
|- style="text-align:center"
|width="35%"|Previous race:2021 World RX of Benelux
|width="40%"|World RX of Benelux
|width="35%"|Next race:-
|- style="text-align:center"

Belgium
World RX
World RX